Red, Hot and Blue is a 1949 American musical comedy film starring Betty Hutton as an actress who gets mixed up with gangsters and murder. Frank Loesser wrote the songs and plays a key role.

The film has no connection to Cole Porter's play of the same name.

Plot
Hair-Do Lempke snatches actress Eleanor Collier, believing her to be a witness to the murder of his gangster boss. Eleanor tells him her story.

While rooming with girlfriends Sandra and No-No and desperately trying to become a star, Eleanor resists the marriage proposals of theater director Danny James, her boyfriend. Her agent Charlie Baxter sets her up on a date with wealthy Alex Creek, who owns a baseball team and occasionally sponsors the careers of starlets. Alex's wife objects, dumping water on Eleanor.

A bigshot, Bunny Harris, is introduced to Eleanor and might help her career. While in his apartment, though, Bunny is gunned down and Eleanor learns from Hair-Do to her surprise that Bunny was a crook. She holds the bad guys at bay until Danny rides to the rescue.

Cast
Betty Hutton as Eleanor Collier
Victor Mature as Danny James
William Demarest as Charlie Baxter
June Havoc as Sandra
Jane Nigh as Angelica Roseanne
Frank Loesser as Hair-do Lempke
William Talman as Bunny Harris
Art Smith as Laddie Corwin
Raymond Walburn as Alex Ryan Creek
Onslow Stevens as Captain Allen
Barry Kelley as Lieutenant Gorman
Jack Kruschen as Steve
Joseph Vitale as Carr
Percy Helton as Mr. Perkins
Ernö Verebes as Waiter
Philip Van Zandt as Louie
Henry Guttman as Frankie
Don Shelton as Hamlet
Herschel Daugherty as Laertes
Dorothy Abbott as The Queen
Julia Faye as Julia
John Marchak as Guard

Production
The film was originally called The Broadway Story. It was the second film from Pioneer Pictures, a recently formed independent production company. Charles Lederer wrote the script based on stories provided by such Broadway columnists as Dorothy Kilgallen, Louis Sobol, Danton Walker and Earl Wilson. It was to start filming October 1, 1948, following the production of Pioneer's first film, Kingsblood Royal, based on the novel by Sinclair Lewis. Lloyd Nolan was discussed for the male lead.

However Pioneer ended up selling the project to Paramount Studios in September 1948 as a vehicle for Betty Hutton. Frank Tashlin was hired to rewrite the script. Robert Fellows was to produce and John Farrow to direct. It was Hutton's first film in two years.

The film was retitled Restless Angel. Ray Milland was going to star, but it was decided to loan him out to Fox; his role was taken by Victor Mature, who had just made Samson and Delilah for Paramount. Mature and Hutton had not previously acted together and Paramount hoped this novelty would prove attractive at the box-office.

The title was changed again to Red Hot and Blue. Filming started January 10, 1949.

June Havoc was cast after Betty Hutton saw her appear on stage in Rain. Frank Loesser made his acting debut, as a gangster, and wrote four songs.

Filming ended in March 1949.

References

External links

1949 films
American crime comedy films
American musical comedy films
Films directed by John Farrow
Paramount Pictures films
1949 musical comedy films
American black-and-white films
1940s American films